The 2017 World Men's Curling Championship (branded as Ford World Men's Curling Championship 2017 for sponsorship reasons) was a curling event that was held from April 1 to 9 at Northlands Coliseum in Edmonton, Alberta.

Canada won the title for the 36th time overall and the second consecutive year.  Like Rachel Homan's team at the women's tournament, Brad Gushue and his teammates finished with a perfect 13–0 record, which included defeating eventual runner-up Niklas Edin of Sweden three times.  Switzerland won the bronze medal.

With the win, Gushue became the first skip in the history of the sport to win the world junior title, the Olympic gold medal, and the world men's title, and Canada became the first country ever to be in simultaneous possession of Olympic and World championships in both men's and women's curling.

Qualification
The following nations qualified to participate in the 2017 World Men's Curling Championship:
 (host country)
One team from the Americas zone
 (winner of the 2017 Americas Challenge)
Eight teams from the 2016 European Curling Championships

 (winner of the World Challenge Games)
Two teams from the 2016 Pacific-Asia Curling Championships

Teams
{| class=wikitable
|-
!width=200|
!width=200|
!width=200|
|-
|Bally Haly G&CC & St. John's CC, St. John's
Skip: Brad Gushue
Third: Mark Nichols
Second: Brett Gallant
Lead: Geoff Walker
Alternate: Thomas Sallows
|Harbin CC, Harbin
Skip: Liu Rui
Third: Xu Xiaoming
Second: Ba Dexin
Lead: Zang Jialiang
Alternate: Zou Qiang
|Baden Hills G&CC, Rheinmünster
Skip: Alexander Baumann
Third: Manuel Walter
Second: Daniel Herberg
Lead: Ryan Sherrard
Alternate: Sebastian Schweizer
|-
!width=200|
!width=200|
!width=200|
|-
|A.S.D. Trentino Curling, Cembra
Fourth: Amos Mosaner
Skip: Joël Retornaz
Second: Andrea Pilzer
Lead: Daniele Ferrazza
Alternate: Simone Gonin
|Karuizawa CC, Karuizawa
Skip: Yusuke Morozumi
Third: Tetsuro Shimizu
Second: Tsuyoshi Yamaguchi
Lead: Kosuke Morozumi
Alternate: Kosuke Hirata
|CC PWA Zoetermeer, Zoetermeer
Skip: Jaap van Dorp
Third: Wouter Gösgens
Second: Laurens Hoekman
Lead: Carlo Glasbergen
Alternate: Alexander Magan|-
!width=200|
!width=200|
!width=200|
|-
|Oppdal CK, OppdalSkip: Steffen Walstad
Third: Markus Høiberg
Second: Magnus Nedregotten
Lead: Alexander Lindström
Alternate: Sander Rølvåg|Moskvitch CC, MoscowSkip: Alexey Timofeev
Third: Alexey Stukalskiy
Second: Timur Gadzhikanov
Lead: Artur Razhabov
Alternate: Evgeny Klimov|Curl Aberdeen, AberdeenSkip: David Murdoch
Third: Greg Drummond
Second: Scott Andrews
Lead: Michael Goodfellow
Alternate: Ross Paterson|-
!width=200|
!width=200|
!width=200|
|-
|Karlstads CK, Karlstad 
Skip: Niklas Edin
Third: Oskar Eriksson
Second: Rasmus Wranå
Lead: Christoffer Sundgren
Alternate: Henrik Leek|CC Genève, GenevaFourth: Benoît Schwarz  
Third: Claudio Pätz
Skip: Peter de Cruz
Lead: Valentin Tanner
Alternate: Romano Meier|Duluth CC, DuluthSkip: John Shuster
Third: Tyler George
Second: Matt Hamilton
Lead: John Landsteiner
Alternate: Joe Polo|}
Notes
  Stuklaskiy threw skip stones during Draws 1, 3 and 17 while Timofeev threw third stones.

WCT ranking
Year to date World Curling Tour order of merit ranking for each team prior to the event.

Round-robin standingsFinal round-robin standingsRound-robin results
All times listed in Mountain Daylight Time (UTC−6).

Draw 1Saturday, April 1, 14:00Draw 2Saturday, April 1, 19:00Draw 3Sunday, April 2, 9:00Draw 4Sunday, April 2, 14:00Draw 5Sunday, April 2, 19:00Draw 6Monday, April 3, 9:00Draw 7Monday, April 3, 14:00Draw 8Monday, April 3, 19:00Draw 9Tuesday, April 4, 9:00Draw 10Tuesday, April 4, 14:00Draw 11Tuesday, April 4, 19:00Draw 12Wednesday, April 5, 9:00Draw 13Wednesday, April 5, 14:00Draw 14Wednesday, April 5, 19:00Draw 15Thursday, April 6, 9:00Draw 16Thursday, April 6, 14:00Draw 17Thursday, April 6, 19:00Playoffs

1 vs. 2Friday, April 7, 19:003 vs. 4Saturday, April 8, 14:00SemifinalSaturday, April 8, 19:00Bronze medal gameSunday, April 9, 12:00Gold medal gameSunday, April 9, 18:00Statistics
Top 5 player percentagesRound robin onlyPerfect gamesRound Robin only''

Awards
The awards and all-star team are as follows:

All-Star Team
Skip:  Brad Gushue, Canada
Third:  Mark Nichols, Canada
Second:  Brett Gallant, Canada
Lead:  Geoff Walker, Canada

Collie Campbell Memorial Award
 Carlo Glasbergen, Netherlands

References
General

Specific

External links
 

World Men's Curling Championship
2017 in Canadian curling
2017 in Alberta
Curling competitions in Edmonton
International curling competitions hosted by Canada
April 2017 sports events in Canada
2010s in Edmonton